This is a list of hospitals in Hawaii (U.S. state), sorted by island and hospital name.  According to the American Hospital Directory, there were 28 hospitals in Hawaii in 2020.  There are hospitals on six of Hawaii's 137 islands.

Hawaii (big island)
The following hospitals are on the big island of Hawaii:
 Hilo Medical Center - Hilo, 276 beds
 Ka'u Hospital - Pahala, 6 beds
 Kohala Hospital - Kapaau, 18 beds
 Kona Community Hospital - Kealakekua, 94 beds
 North Hawaii Community Hospital - Waimea (Kamuela), 33 beds

Kauai
The following hospitals are on the island of Kauai
 Kauai Veterans Memorial Hospital - Waimea, 45 beds
 Samuel Mahelona Memorial Hospital - Kapaa, 80 beds
 Wilcox Memorial Hospital - Lihue, 72 beds

Lanai
There is only one hospital on the island of Lanai:
 Lanai Community Hospital - 628 7th Street, Lanai City, 14 beds. This hospital is managed by Maui Health, which also manages two hospitals on Maui.  It is a community health center providing primary care, dental, behavioral health and selected specialty services

Maui
There are two hospitals and one cancer institute on the island of Maui:
 Cancer Institute of Maui - Wailuku
 Kula Hospital - Kula, 123 beds. This hospital is managed by Maui Health, which is affiliated with Kaiser Permanente.  
 Maui Memorial Medical Center - Wailuku, 219 beds.  This hospital is managed by Maui Health.

Molokai
There is only one hospital on the island of Molokai:
 Molokai General Hospital - 280 Homeolu Place, Kaunakakai, 15 beds.   It was established as Shingle Memorial Hospital in 1932 by the Grace Episcopal Church.  In 1949 it became the Molokai Community Hospital.  In 1963, the hospital was moved to its current location in Kaunakakai, where it was known as the Molokai General Hospital.    In Since 1985, this hospital has been part of the Queen's Health Systems family of companies.

Oahu

Outside of Honolulu, there are six hospitals on the island of Oahu:
 Adventist Health Castle (formerly Castle Medical Center) - Kailua, 160 beds
 Hawaii State Hospital - Kaneohe, 144 beds
 Kahuku Medical Center, Kahuku, 21 beds
 Pali Momi Medical Center - Aiea, 118 beds
 The Queen's Medical Center West Oahu - ʻEwa Beach, 135 beds
 Wahiawa General Hospital - Wahiawa, 150 beds

Honolulu

There are eight hospitals in Honolulu on the island of Oahu:
 Kaiser Permanente Moanalua Medical Center, 295 beds
 Kapi'olani Medical Center for Women & Children, 253 beds
 Kuakini Medical Center, 357 beds
 REHAB Hospital of the Pacific, a specialzed physical rehabilitation hospital
 The Queen's Medical Center, Hawaii's only Level 1 Trauma Center, 650 beds
 Shriners Hospital for Children, 24 beds
 Straub Clinic & Hospital, 159 beds
 Tripler Army Medical Center, approximately 220 beds, expandable as needed

References

Hawaii
 
Hospitals